Blacklands or Blackland may refer to:

Places

In Texas 
 Blackland, Austin, Texas, a neighborhood in Austin
 Blackland, Texas, a town in Rockwall County
 Blackland Army Airfield, a former name of Waco Regional Airport
 Texas Blackland Prairies, an ecoregion

Elsewhere 
 Blackland, Charlotte County, New Brunswick, Canada
 Blackland, Mississippi, an unincorporated community in Prentiss County, Mississippi
 Blackland, Restigouche County, New Brunswick, Canada
 Blacklands (archaeological site), a Roman site in the parish of King's Sutton, Northamptonshire, England
 Blacklands, Ayrshire, an area of Kilwinning, Ayrshire, Scotland
 Blacklands, County Tyrone, a townland in County Tyrone, Northern Ireland
 Blacklands Parish, a suburban area in the town of Hastings, East Sussex, England
 Blackland, Wiltshire, a hamlet and former parish

Music
 Blackland Records
 Blacklands (album), the second and final album from Music for Pleasure, released in 1985

See also 
 Black earth (disambiguation)
 Blacklands Railroad
 The Barsac Mission
 Mordor